
Lwówek Śląski County is a unit of territorial administration and local government (powiat) in Lower Silesian Voivodeship, south-western Poland. It came into being on January 1, 1999, as a result of the Polish local government reforms passed in 1998. Its administrative seat is the town of Lwówek Śląski, and it also contains the towns of Gryfów Śląski, Mirsk, Wleń and Lubomierz.

As of 2019 the total population of the county is 45,975, the most populated towns are Lwówek Śląski with 8,869 inhabitants and Gryfów Śląski with 6,636 inhabitants.

Neighbouring counties
Lwówek Śląski County is bordered by Lubań County to the west, Bolesławiec County to the north, Złotoryja County to the east and Jelenia Góra County to the south. It also borders the Czech Republic to the south.

Administrative division
The county is subdivided into five gminas (all of them urban-rural, centred on the five towns). These are listed in the following table, in descending order of population.

References

 
Land counties of Lower Silesian Voivodeship